Lamotte, LaMotte or La Motte may refer to:

Places

Canada
 La Motte, Quebec

France
 La Grande-Motte, in the Hérault département
 La Motte, Côtes-d'Armor, in the Côtes-d'Armor département
 La Motte, Var, in the Var département
 La Motte-Chalancon, in the Drôme département
 La Motte-d'Aigues, in the Vaucluse département
 La Motte-d'Aveillans, in the l'Isère département
 La Motte-de-Galaure, in the Drôme département
 La Motte-du-Caire, in the Alpes-de-Haute-Provence département
 La Motte-en-Bauges, in the Savoie département
 La Motte-en-Champsaur, in the Hautes-Alpes département
 La Motte-Fanjas, in the Drôme département
 La Motte-Feuilly, in the Indre département
 La Motte-Fouquet, in the Orne département
 La Motte-Saint-Jean, in the Saône-et-Loire département
 La Motte-Saint-Martin, in the Isère département
 La Motte-Servolex, in the Savoie département
 La Motte-Ternant, in the Côte-d'Or département
 La Motte-Tilly, in the Aube département
 Lamotte-Beuvron, in the Loir-et-Cher département
 Lamotte-Brebière, in the Somme département
 Lamotte-Buleux, in the Somme département
 La Motte-de-Galaure, a commune in the Drôme department
 Lamotte-du-Rhône, in the Vaucluse département
 Lamotte-Warfusée, in the Somme département
 La Mothe-Achard, in the Vendée département
 La Mothe-en-Bassigny, a destroyed city and citadel in the Haute-Marne département
 La Mothe-Saint-Héray, in the Deux-Sèvres département
 Lamothe, Haute-Loire, in the Haute-Loire département
 Lamothe, Landes, in the Landes département
 Lamothe-Capdeville, in the Tarn-et-Garonne département
 Lamothe-Cassel, in the Lot département
 Lamothe-Cumont, in the Tarn-et-Garonne département
 Lamothe-en-Blaisy, in the Haute-Marne département
 Lamothe-Fénelon, in the Lot département
 Lamothe-Goas, in the Gers département
 Lamothe-Landerron, in the Gironde département
 Lamothe-Montravel, in the Dordogne département
 Saint-Jean-de-la-Motte, a commune in the Sarthe department in the region of Pays-de-la-Loire
 a lieu-dit in Ledringhem, in the Nord département

United States
 La Motte, Iowa, a city
 LaMotte, Missouri, a ghost town
 Lamotte Township, Crawford County, Illinois
 Lamotte Township, Michigan

Other
 LaMotte (surname)
 Lamotte-Picquet (D 645), French anti-submarine frigate
 French ship La Motte-Picquet, the name of three other ships of the French Navy

See also

 Motte
 
 
 
 Lamotte-Picquet (disambiguation)